The Maçka Gondola, aka Maçka – Taşkışla Aerial Cable Car, is a two-station gondola-type line of aerial lift passenger transport system situated in Şişli district of Istanbul, Turkey. It is operated under the line number Tf1 by Istanbul Transport Company, a subsidiary of Istanbul Metropolitan Municipality. The fare is paid by the contactless smart card of Istanbulkart, which is valid at all public transport in Istanbul.

They are normally connected by a long horse-shoe formed drive around the valley, which contains the Maçka Democracy Park and the Beyoğlu Marriage Office. While the Maçka Station is a gateway to the upscale neighborhoods Teşvikiye and Nişantaşı, the Taşkışla Station is in walking distance to Taksim Square. There exist campuses of the Istanbul Technical University on both sides of the valley as well as a number of five-star hotels like ParkSA Hilton Hotel, Swissôtel Istanbul The Bosphorus Hotel at the Maçka side and Hilton Istanbul Bosphorus, Hyatt Regency, Divan Istanbul at the Taşkışla side. The Cemil Topuzlu Open-Air Theatre is situated close to the Taşkışla Station.

Gondola lift system
The line was designed and the system was delivered by the French company Poma, and the construction was carried out by Turkish company Baytur. It is a two-station overhead transport system without any support tower in the middle of the line distance.

The pulse-movement gondola system runs two sets of two unidirectional six-seater tandem cabins. In each direction, there are two ropes, one for carriyng and the other for hauling the cabins. The cabins stop at the terminal, and they are accelerated to line speed at 4 m/s (13 ft/s) after leaving the terminal. In case of power supply cut, a standby generator ensures the travel of the cabins to the target station at a low speed.

Fare is collected for both directions at the Maçka Terminal.

Specifications

 Line length: 
 Number of stations: 2
 Number of cabins: 4
 Trip duration: 3.5 minutes
 Operational hours: 07:30–21:00 (weekdays), 08:00–19:00 (Sundays)
 Daily ridership: 1,000 passengers daily
 Number of daily trips: 90
 Frequency: 5 minutes during peak hours
 Fare: 2.30 (by Istanbulkart)

Stations

See also
 List of gondola lifts in Turkey

References

External links
 Images of Maçka Gondola

Transport in Istanbul
Gondola lifts in Turkey
Şişli
1993 establishments in Turkey
Transport infrastructure completed in 1993
Aerial tramways in Turkey

he:רכבל מאצ'קה-טשקישלה